The Beijing Tourism Group (BTG) is a Chinese state-owned enterprise operating in various areas of tourism, including travel agencies, dining, hotels, shopping and entertainment. It is headquartered in Beijing Municipal Administrative Center in Tongzhou District, Beijing.

Operations 
The company has six divisions:
 BTG Homeinns — Hotels and resorts
Travel agencies
Shopping
Restaurants
Coaches and taxis
Scenic spots

History 
BTG was established in February 1998.

In 2004 it merged with Beijing New Yansha Group (the developer of the Golden Resources Mall), restaurant operators Quanjude and Donglaishun, and the Antique City Group.

In 2015 BTG bought the Home Inn hotel chain for 11 billion RMB.

In 2016 it had RMB 73 billion in assets and RMB 44 billion in revenue.

In 2017, China launched the World Tourism Alliance with the support of the BTG.

References 

Companies based in Beijing
Tourism in China
Travel and holiday companies of China